Phillip John Vandersea (born February 25, 1943) is an American former American football player.

He was born in Whitinsville, Massachusetts. After graduating from high school in Northbridge, Massachusetts, Vandersea played football for the University of Massachusetts Amherst, weighing in at 245 pounds and standing 6'3" tall. Vandersea played linebacker and defensive end.

He was drafted by the Green Bay Packers in the 16th round (220th overall) of the 1965 NFL Draft and played for the 1965 NFL Champion Packers in 1966, and also the 1968 and 1969 seasons. While playing for the Packers, Phil wore jersey number 37. He spent the 1967 season with the New Orleans Saints. He played in 46 career games in the NFL.

References

External links 
Phil Vandersea Past Stats, Statistics, History, and Awards - databaseFootball.com

1943 births
Living people
People from Northbridge, Massachusetts
Sportspeople from Worcester County, Massachusetts
Players of American football from Massachusetts
American football defensive ends
American football linebackers
UMass Minutemen football players
Green Bay Packers players
New Orleans Saints players